Azaadi is a 2018 Pakistani action thriller war film, that was released on 16 June 2018. It is written, directed and co-produced by Imran Malik with his brother Irfan Malik under the banner of their father Pervez Malik Films. Based on the issue of Kashmir conflict and freedom for Jammu and Kashmir, the film stars Moammar Rana, Sonya Hussain and Nadeem Baig in the leading roles. Dialogues for the film are written by Wajid Zuberi, and the film has been distributed by ARY Films.

Cast
Moammar Rana as Azaad, a character based on the Kashmiri militant Burhan Wani
Mariyam Khalif as Child artist
Sonya Hussain as Zara; a Pakistani-origin British journalist, Azaad's wife
Nadeem Baig as Azaad's father
 Mariam Ansari
 Ali Bilal
 Erum Azam as Sheena
 Ali Fateh
 Samama Randhawa
 Waseem
 Zeeshan
 Saddam ul Hque as Major Sunil
 Omer Shahzad as Raj (cameo)

Production

Casting
Danish Taimoor was originally cast opposite lead female Sonya Hussain, as the lead male character of the film. But due to the fallout with the makers of the film he was later replaced by Moammar. Pakistani television actress Sonya Hussain, plays the lead female role of a Pakistani-origin British journalist. Vetern Pakistani actor Nadeem Baig will essay the father figure role in the film who devotes his life to the Kashmir struggle and passes on his vision of struggle to the youth.

Development
In an interview with DAWN Images, director Imran highlighted that a film of such a big canvas has never been attempted before in Pakistan, and that the film had elements of patriotism, action scenes and a very powerful love story. The cinematography has been done by Ben Jasper.

Filming
The film has been shot in Azad Kashmir and Northern areas of Pakistan.

Music
The music of the film has been done by Sahir Ali Bagga, Jabar Abbas, Shafqat Amanat Ali Khan and Afshan Abbas. Singers Rahat Fateh Ali Khan and Qurat-ul-Ain Balouch have also lent their voices for the soundtrack. Natasha Khan from Coke Studio was the audio engineer of the movie.

Release
The Film was released on Eid-ul-Fitr in Pakistan.

Box office
The film collected 64 million in its first week despite having tough competition from Bollywood movie Race 3 and three other Pakistani films including Saat Din Mohabbat In, Wajood and Na Band Na Baraati.

See also
 List of Pakistani films of 2018

References

External links
 
 

2018 action thriller films
2010s action war films
2018 films
Pakistani epic films
Pakistani action thriller films
Pakistani action war films
Films scored by Sahir Ali Bagga
2010s Urdu-language films
India–Pakistan relations in popular culture
Kashmir conflict in films
Military of Pakistan in films
Films set in Azad Kashmir